Constance Lake Water Aerodrome  is located  northeast of Carp on Constance Lake, Ontario, Canada.

See also
 List of airports in the Ottawa area

References

Registered aerodromes in Ontario
Seaplane bases in Ontario
Registered aerodromes in Cochrane District